Mar Joseph Pamplany is the Metropolitan Archbishop of the Archdiocese of Tellicherry. He was elected by the synod of the Syro-Malabar Catholic Church as the successor of Mar George Njaralakatt on 15 January 2022 while servicing as the Auxiliary Bishop of Tellicherry.

Mar Joseph Pamplany was born on 3 December 1969 at Charal, Kannur.

He has obtained Ph.D. in Sacred Scripture from Belgium, and he is a well-known writer and versatile orator and has published more than 30 books and over 300 articles.

Pamplany is the founder of Alpha Institute, Thalassery.

Previous Ordinaries 

 Archbishop George Njaralakatt (29 Aug 2014 Appointed - 15 Jan 2022 Retired)
 Archbishop Mar George Valiamattam (1995 - 2014 Retired)
 Bishop Sebastian Valloppilly (1955 - 1989)

References

External links 
 New Archbishop, Bishop For Syro Malabar Church | Kochi News - Times of India
 Syro Malabar Church Bishop ::Mar Joseph Pamplany Aux. Bishop ::Tellicherry Archeparchy
 3 more bishops for Syro-Malabar Church
 AUXILIARY BISHOP OF THALASSERY | Archdiocese of Tellichery
 Mar Joseph Pamplany Elected as Archbishop of Tellicherry and Mar Peter Kochupurackal as new Bishop of Palghat – CCBI

Indian bishops
1969 births
Living people